Qarasu is a village in the municipality of Şilyan in the Kurdamir Rayon of Azerbaijan.

References

Populated places in Kurdamir District